Eduardo Marques de Jesus Passos, or simply Eduardo Marques (born June 26, 1976), is a Brazilian striker, currently played for AEP Paphos in the Cypriot First Division.

Honours
APOP Kinyras
 Cypriot Cup: 2008–09

References

External links

 

1976 births
Living people
Brazilian footballers
Brazilian expatriate footballers
Guarani FC players
Santos FC players
Sport Club do Recife players
Grêmio Foot-Ball Porto Alegrense players
Hapoel Tel Aviv F.C. players
Maccabi Tel Aviv F.C. players
Daegu FC players
Shonan Bellmare players
APOP Kinyras FC players
Aris Limassol FC players
Zhejiang Professional F.C. players
AEP Paphos FC players
C.F. Os Belenenses players
Expatriate footballers in Portugal
Brazilian expatriate sportspeople in Portugal
Expatriate footballers in Japan
Brazilian expatriate sportspeople in Japan
Expatriate footballers in Israel
Brazilian expatriate sportspeople in South Korea
Expatriate footballers in South Korea
Expatriate footballers in China
Brazilian expatriate sportspeople in China
Brazilian expatriate sportspeople in Cyprus
Expatriate footballers in Cyprus
J2 League players
K League 1 players
Primeira Liga players
Cypriot First Division players
Chinese Super League players
Association football forwards